Tilden Township is one of sixteen townships in Cherokee County, Iowa, USA.  As of the 2000 census, its population was 194.

History
Tilden Township was named after Joseph White Tilden (1819–1903) a pioneer who emigrated first from Lebanon, Connecticut, to Forest Lake, Pennsylvania, to Springfield, Illinois, and then to Winneshiek County, Iowa. In 1866, he claimed as a homestead  of section 26, residing there with his wife, Irene Elizabeth West, and five children.  They moved to the Washington Territory in 1885.

Geography
According to the USGS, it contains two cemeteries: Mount Pleasant and Trinity.

References

External links
 US-Counties.com
 City-Data.com

Townships in Cherokee County, Iowa
Townships in Iowa